The Fierza Reservoir is a reservoir in Albania and Kosovo. The Drin River and parts of the White Drin and Black Drin also runs through the reservoir. It is 70 km long and has a depth of 128 m. In the Albanian side of the lake there are many canyons and some small islands. The dam is 167m tall. In 2014, the lake was declared a Regional Nature Park by the Kukes County Council.

The reservoir was formed as a result of the construction of the Fierza Hydroelectric Power Station in 1978 by the Albanian government.

See also 

 Lakes of Albania
 Geography of Albania
 Lakes of Kosovo
 Geography of Kosovo

References 

 
 

Lakes of Albania
Lakes of Kosovo
Albania–Kosovo border
Geography of Kukës County
Tourist attractions in Kukës County